Miss Hungary is a national Beauty pageant in Hungary first held in 1929.

History

 1929 - World War II The first pageant was held in 1929 and the winner of it won the Miss Europe title. In 1936 Zsa Zsa Gabor won the title, but she was underaged so she couldn't compete in Miss Europe. Later she became a Hollywood actress and celebrity and wife of Conrad Hilton.
 From World War II until 1985 the pageant was not held, for political reasons: Hungary was a communist country.
 1985 The pageant was held again. More than 2,000 contestants vied for the crown, and it was won by a 16-year-old girl, Csilla Molnár. In 1985 she competed in the unofficial Miss Europe pageant when in the preliminaries she was to win, but at the end she came as 2nd runner-up. In the summer of 1986 she committed suicide.
 1986-1988 Because of Ms Molnar's death the pageant wasn't held.
 1989 This year was the first when Hungary competed in Miss World.
 1989-1996 The winner of this pageant was sent to the Miss World (except in 1993, when there wasn't Hungarian contestant). Since 1996 the winner of the Miss World Hungary pageant has been sent to this event.
 1997 the pageant wasn't held
 since 1998 the event has been held again.

Titleholders
Color key

See also
 Miss Universe Hungary
 Magyarország Szépe
 the Belle of the Anna-ball

References

External links
 Miss Hungary official site
 Miss World Hungary 2008

Beauty pageants in Hungary
Recurring events established in 1929
Hungarian awards